German submarine U-3008 was a Type XXI U-boat of Nazi Germany's Kriegsmarine that served in the United States Navy for several years after World War II.

Her keel was laid down on 2 July 1944 by DeSchiMAG AG Weser of Bremen, and she was commissioned on 19 October 1944 with Kapitänleutnant Fokko Schlömer in command. In March 1945 Schlömer was relieved by Kapitänleutnant Helmut Manseck who commanded the boat until Nazi Germany's surrender on 8 May.

Design
Like all Type XXI U-boats, U-3008 had a displacement of  when at the surface and  while submerged. The submarine was powered by two MAN SE supercharged six-cylinder M6V40/46KBB diesel engines each providing , two Siemens-Schuckert GU365/30 double-acting electric motors each providing , and two Siemens-Schuckert silent running GV232/28 electric motors each providing .

U-3008 was fitted with six  torpedo tubes in the bow and four  C/30 anti-aircraft guns. She could carry twenty-three torpedoes or seventeen torpedoes and twelve mines. The complement was five officers and fifty-two men.

Service history

Kriegsmarine
U-3008 left Wilhelmshaven for patrol on 3 May 1945, but returned to port after the surrender. On 21 June 1945 she was taken by the Allies from Wilhelmshaven to Loch Ryan, thence transferred to the United States, reaching New London, Connecticut, on 22 August.

United States Navy
On 13 September, she moved to the Portsmouth Navy Yard in Kittery, Maine, where she began an extensive overhaul the following day. Work proceeded on an intermittent basis due to the lack of final and total approval of the vessel's allocation to the United States by the Allied powers concerned. However, by the spring of 1946, the naval shipyard received orders to proceed with the overhaul as expeditiously as possible and to place the submarine in service immediately upon its completion. U-3008's overhaul was completed by mid-summer, and she was placed into active U.S. Navy service on 24 July 1946 with Commander Everett H. Steinmetz in charge.

U-3008 was assigned initially to Submarine Squadron 2 and operated along the New England coast out of New London and Portsmouth. That duty continued until 31 March 1947, when she departed New London bound ultimately for Key West, Florida, and duty with the Operational Development Force. En route, the U-boat stopped off at Norfolk, Virginia, for three weeks of underway operations with Task Force 67. She continued south on 19 April and arrived at Key West on 23 April. There, she reported for duty with Submarine Squadron 4 and began working with the Operational Development Force. That duty involved the development of submarine and antisubmarine tactics and lasted until October 1947 when she returned to New London.

The U-boat conducted operations out of New London and Portsmouth between October 1947 and February 1948. On 28 February, she stood out of New London to return to Florida. She reached Key West on 5 March and resumed duty with the Operational Development Force. She remained so engaged until the end of the first week in June. On 7 June, she headed north once more and arrived in Portsmouth on 11 June. On 18 June 1948, U-3008 was placed out of service at the Portsmouth Navy Yard in New Hampshire.

Though out of service, U-3008 remained a Navy test hulk for several years. She was scuttled in a series of demolition tests in 1954. The hulk was raised and towed to the Navy drydock at Roosevelt Roads where she was offered up for sale in 1955. She was sold to Loudes Iron & Metal Company on 15 September 1955, and the purchaser took possession of her on 17 January 1956. She was subsequently scrapped.

See also

References

Bibliography

External links

Type XXI submarines
U-boats commissioned in 1944
Captured U-boats
World War II submarines of Germany
Research submarines of the United States
Submarines of the United States Navy
1944 ships
Ships built in Bremen (state)